Anine Bing is a women's fashion brand. The brand is based out of Los Angeles, California.
The founder, Anine Bing, is also a blogger as well as a former model and singer.

Anine Bing was launched in 2012 with headquarters in downtown Los Angeles.

Born in Denmark of Danish/Brazilian ancestry, and growing up in Sweden, Bing has lived and worked in London, Stockholm, Los Angeles, Belgium, Hamburg, and Johannesburg. She began modeling at age 15.

References

External links 
Aninebing.com

Clothing retailers of the United States
Companies based in California